|}

The Conqueror Stakes is a Listed flat horse race in Great Britain open to fillies and mares aged three years or older. It is run at Goodwood over a distance of 1 mile (1,609 metres), and it is scheduled to take place each year in late April or early May.

The race was first run in 1997.

Records
Most successful horse (2 wins):
 Aldora - 2003, 2005

Leading jockey (3 wins):
 Richard Quinn - Corinium (2000), Dolores (2002), Nantyglo (2006)

Leading trainer (3 wins):
 Henry Cecil - Out West (1997), Digitalize (1998), Corinium (2000)

Winners

See also 
Horse racing in Great Britain
List of British flat horse races

References
Racing Post:

Flat races in Great Britain
Goodwood Racecourse
Mile category horse races for fillies and mares
1997 establishments in England
Recurring sporting events established in 1997